André Filipe Cunha Vidigal (born 17 August 1998) is a Portuguese professional footballer who plays for Marítimo as a left winger.

Club career

Académica
Born in Elvas, Vidigal began his career as a youth with O Elvas C.A.D. before joining Académica. On 8 January 2017, he made his professional debut  in a 2016–17 LigaPro match against FC Porto B, coming on as a 70th-minute substitute for Rui Miguel in a 2–1 away loss. He made five more appearances, all off the bench.

Fortuna Sittard
On 7 July 2017, Vidigal moved to Fortuna Sittard of the Dutch Eerste Divisie on a one-year loan. He made his debut on 18 August in a season-opening 5–1 home win over FC Dordrecht, scoring within ten minutes of coming on in place of Gavin Vlijter. The deal was made permanent on 19 December 2017, effective from the new year. He scored 10 goals in 29 games as the team returned to the Eredivisie for the first time since 2002, as runners-up to Jong Ajax; this included hat-tricks in wins away to SC Telstar and Almere City FC.

Vidigal added another hat-trick on 25 September 2018 in the first round of the KNVB Cup, a 5–0 win at second-tier Helmond Sport.

Vidigal was loaned to APOEL FC, reigning champions of the Cypriot First Division, on 31 January 2019. He made his debut ten days later in a 2–0 win at Enosis Neon Paralimni FC, and scored within five minutes as a late substitute. His team retained the title and finished cup runners-up to AEL Limassol; in September they took the Super Cup as well.

On 3 September 2020, Vidigal returned to Portugal's second tier on loan to G.D. Estoril Praia. He scored eight times in 39 total games for the Canarinhos, including six in their league-winning campaign.

Marítimo
On 11 June 2021, Vidigal signed a three-year contract with Primeira Liga club C.S. Marítimo. He scored his first goal in his country's top flight on 16 August to open a 2–1 win at Belenenses SAD.

Personal life
His Angolan father Beto and his uncles Lito, Luís, Jorge and Toni were all professional footballers. Born in Portugal, Vidigal is of Angolan descent and holds both passports; he had relatives who were full internationals for each country's national teams.

Honours
APOEL
Cypriot First Division: 2018–19
Cypriot Super Cup: 2019

Estoril
Liga Portugal 2: 2020–21

References

External links

Stats and profile at LPFP 

1998 births
People from Elvas
Living people
Portuguese footballers
Portugal youth international footballers
Portuguese sportspeople of Angolan descent
Association football forwards
Primeira Liga players
Liga Portugal 2 players
Associação Académica de Coimbra – O.A.F. players
G.D. Estoril Praia players
C.S. Marítimo players
Eerste Divisie players
Eredivisie players
Fortuna Sittard players
Cypriot First Division players
APOEL FC players
Portuguese expatriate footballers
Expatriate footballers in the Netherlands
Expatriate footballers in Cyprus
Portuguese expatriate sportspeople in the Netherlands
Portuguese expatriate sportspeople in Cyprus
Sportspeople from Portalegre District